In March 1880 the British Liberal Party bounced back from earlier losses to gain both liberal and conservative seats, but when their representative Henry Strutt succeeded to the peerage a few months later, they were unable to retain the second seat. Their candidate, John McLaren, was defeated by only two votes by the Conservative Milne Home. After scrutiny it was found that scale of the Conservative victory was actually three votes rather than two.

History of Berwick-upon-Tweed
By-elections to the Parliament of the United Kingdom in Northumberland constituencies
1880 elections in the United Kingdom
1880 in England
19th century in Northumberland
March 1880 events